
Gmina Wola Mysłowska is a rural gmina (administrative district) in Łuków County, Lublin Voivodeship, in eastern Poland.

Villages
Gmina Wola Mysłowska contains the villages and settlements of Baczków, Błażków, Ciechomin, Dwornia, Dychawica, Germanicha, Grudź, Jarczew, Kamień, Ksawerynówek, Lisikierz, Mysłów, Nowy Świat, Osiny, Powały, Stara Huta, Świder, Wandów, Wilczyska, Wola Mysłowska and Wólka Ciechomska.

Neighbouring gminas
Gmina Wola Mysłowska is bordered by the gminas of Kłoczew, Krzywda, Miastków Kościelny, Stanin, Stoczek Łukowski and Żelechów.

References
Polish official population figures 2006

Wola Myslowska
Łuków County